Victoria "Vicki" Blight is a radio DJ based in the United Kingdom. Blight has presented shows on Heart 106, a regional radio station broadcast to the East Midlands, Absolute Radio, BBC Radio 1 and currently BBC Radio Wales. The name Blight is of Cornish origin.

Early radio career

Vicki Blight was involved in student radio at Cardiff University, where she went on to win Best Female Presenter at the Radio 1 Student Radio Award in 2002.

From there, she became a presenter on Red Dragon FM, a commercial radio station based in South Wales, in 2003. After graduating, she joined independent station Century FM.

Heart 106

Vicki Blight has presented various shows on Nottingham-based Heart 106, including a weekday afternoon slot and a topical phone-in show.

She has additionally presented an overnight slot and a weekend slot on the station, and, in under a year, she became the co-presenter of the breakfast show.

BBC Radio 1
In 2007, Blight was awarded with the Friday Early Breakfast slot on the station, and presented the slot for a month.

She was rumoured to be the new Radio 1 Surgery presenter on BBC Radio 1; these rumours have since been proved false when Kelly Osbourne was unveiled as the new presenter in September 2007.

References

External links
Vicki Blight (BBC Radio Wales)

Living people
British people of Cornish descent
Year of birth missing (living people)
BBC Radio Wales presenters